Algebra i Logika (English: Algebra and Logic) is a peer-reviewed Russian mathematical journal founded in 1962 by Anatoly Ivanovich Malcev, published by the Siberian Fund for Algebra and Logic at Novosibirsk State University. An English translation of the journal is published by Springer-Verlag as Algebra and Logic since 1968. It published papers presented at the meetings of the "Algebra and Logic" seminar at the Novosibirsk State University. The journal is edited by academician Yury Yershov.

The journal is reviewed cover-to-cover in Mathematical Reviews and Zentralblatt MATH.

Abstracting and Indexing
Algebra i Logika is indexed and abstracted in the following databases:

According to the Journal Citation Reports, the journal had a 2020 impact factor of 0.753.

References

External links
Algebra i Logika website
Algebra and Logic website

Mathematics journals
Publications established in 1962
Novosibirsk State University
Magazines published in Novosibirsk
Russian-language journals